Akodon sylvanus, also known as the forest grass mouse or woodland akodont, is a species of rodent in the family Cricetidae.
It is found only in a small part of northwestern Argentina.

References

Jayat, J.P., Ortiz, P.E., Salazar-Bravo, J., Pardiñas, U.F.J. and D'Elía, G. 2010. The Akodon boliviensis species group (Rodentia: Cricetidae: Sigmodontinae) in Argentina: species limits and distribution, with the description of a new entity (first few pages only). Zootaxa 2409:1–61.
Musser, G. G. and M. D. Carleton. 2005. Superfamily Muroidea. pp. 894–1531 in Mammal Species of the World a Taxonomic and Geographic Reference. D. E. Wilson and D. M. Reeder eds. Johns Hopkins University Press, Baltimore.

Akodon
Mammals of Argentina
Mammals described in 1921
Taxa named by Oldfield Thomas
Taxonomy articles created by Polbot